Bromell is a surname. Notable people with the surname include:

Craig Bromell, Canadian radio personality
Henry Bromell (1947–2013), American writer and screenwriter
Lorenzo Bromell (born 1975), American football player
Tony Bromell (born 1932), Irish educationist and politician
Trayvon Bromell (born 1995), American sprinter